EDP may refer to:

Organisations

Companies 
 EDP Group, a Portuguese energy company
 Electronic Dream Plant, a British manufacturer of electronic musical instruments
 EDP Renováveis, a Spanish renewable energy company
 EDP Renewables North America, subsidiary of EDP Renováveis
 EDP Brasil, a Brazilian electrical utility company

Politics 
 English Democrats Party, a political party
 Equality and Democracy Party, a former political party in Turkey
 European Democratic Party, a centrist and social-liberal European political party

Other organizations 
 Eastern Daily Press, a UK regional newspaper
 EDP Sciences, a French publisher

Science, technology, and medicine 
 Emergency disconnect package, a unit used in oil well intervention
 Energy–delay product in digital electronics
 Epoxydocosapentaenoic acid
 Estradiol dipropionate (EDP), an estrogen
 Estradiol dipropionate/hydroxyprogesterone caproate (EDP/OHPC)
 Esquisse d'un Programme, a mathematical monograph by Alexandre Grothendieck
 Ethylenediamine pyrocatechol, an anisotropic wet etchant for silicon in microelectromechanical fabrication
 Emergency shutdown, an Industrial safety system
 Emotionally disturbed person, see Emotional disturbance (disambiguation)
 End diastolic pressure, part of the Pressure–volume loop in cardiology
 EDP Peștera Wind Farm, a wind farm in Romania
 EDP Cernavodă Wind Farm, a wind farm in Romania
 EDP Dobrogea Wind Farm, a wind farm in Romania
 EDP Sarichioi Wind Farm, a wind farm in Romania

Computing 
 Electronic data processing, the use of automated methods to process commercial data
 Embedded DisplayPort (eDP), a digital display interface
 European Data Portal, an initiative of the European Commission to gather public sector information
 Information technology audit, formerly electronic data processing audit (EDP audit), examination of the management controls of an Information technology (IT) infrastructure

Other uses 
 Eau de Parfum, a dilution class of perfume
 Edinburgh Park railway station, Scotland (station code)
 Xingtai East railway station, China Railway telegraph code EDP
 Excessive deficit procedure, a procedure within the EU Stability and Growth Pact
 Lisbon Marathon EDP, annual marathon held in Portugal
 Valencia Marathon, also known as Marathon Valencia Trinidad Alfonso EDP, annual marathon held in Spain

See also 
 European Data Protection Supervisor (EDPS)